Octavio Martínez is a Mexican former professional tennis player.

Known by the nickname "Tavo", Martínez was born in Mexico City and was a national junior champion in 1970. He played collegiate tennis for the University of Miami, where he earned All-American honors as a senior in 1976. While competing on the international tour he was ranked as high as 310 in the world and represented the Mexico Davis Cup team in a 1972 tie against the United States in Mexico City, losing in the reverse singles to Harold Solomon.

See also
List of Mexico Davis Cup team representatives

References

External links
 
 
 

Year of birth missing (living people)
Living people
Mexican male tennis players
Miami Hurricanes men's tennis players
Tennis players from Mexico City